Saul H. Dubow,  (born 28 October 1959) is a South African historian and academic, specialising in the history of South Africa in the nineteenth and twentieth centuries. Since 2016, he has been the Smuts Professor of Commonwealth History at the University of Cambridge and a Professorial Fellow of Magdalene College, Cambridge. He previously taught at University of Sussex and Queen Mary, University of London.

Early life and education
Dubow was born on 28 October 1959 in Cape Town, South Africa. He studied at the University of Cape Town, graduating with a Bachelor of Arts (BA) degree in 1981. He then moved to England to undertake postgraduate studies at the University of Oxford. As a member of St Antony's College, Oxford, he completed his Doctor of Philosophy (DPhil) degree in 1986. His doctoral thesis was titled "Segregation and 'native administration' in South Africa, 1920-1936",  which formed the basis for his first book, Racial Segregation and the Origins of Apartheid (1989).

Academic career
From 1987 to 1989, Dubow was a British Academy post-doctoral fellow at the Institute of Commonwealth Studies, University of London. He then moved to the University of Sussex as a lecturer in 1989. Having been promoted to senior lecturer and reader over the intervening years, he was appointed Professor of History in 2001. He was awarded an Arts and Humanities Research Council fellowship for 2012. In 2013, he moved to Queen Mary, University of London where he had been appointed Professor of African History.

In October 2016, it was announced that he had been elected as the next Smuts Professor of Commonwealth History at the University of Cambridge in succession to Megan Vaughan. He took up the chair in 2017 and was additionally elected a Professorial Fellow of Magdalene College, Cambridge. Based in the Faculty of History, he teaches courses on the history of modern South Africa, and has wide ranging research interests from racial segregation and Apartheid to intellectual history and the history of science. He delivered his inaugural lecture in November 2018, which is published as `Global Science, National Horizons: South Africa in Deep Time and Space’, Historical Journal, published online by Cambridge University Press: 18 March 2020.

Honours
Dubow is an elected Fellow of the Royal Historical Society (FRHistS). He is an honorary professor of the Centre for African Studies at the University of Cape Town.
Editorial Board, South African Journal of Science  and Journal of Southern African Studies; Chair, Management Committee, Centre of African Studies, Cambridge University.

Selected works

References

 

 
 

Living people
20th-century South African historians
Historians of South Africa
Academics of the University of Sussex
Academics of Queen Mary University of London
Smuts Professors of Commonwealth History
Fellows of Magdalene College, Cambridge
University of Cape Town alumni
Alumni of St Antony's College, Oxford
Historians of race relations
Academics of the Institute of Commonwealth Studies, London
Fellows of the Royal Historical Society
1959 births
Alumni of Herzlia High School
21st-century South African historians